Vydrník is a village and large municipality in Poprad District in the Prešov Region of northern Slovakia.

History
In historical records the village was first mentioned in 1294. It once had a lumber mill, which employed part of the inhabitants.

Geography
The municipality lies at an elevation of 610 metres (2,000 ft) and covers an area of 4.96 km² (1.92 mi²). It has a population of about 970 people.

Economy and infrastructure
Part of the locals work in industrial facilities in Svit and Poprad. The cultural sightseeing is a classical church from the 19th century. Due to its train station, the village is a starting point for the tourists who spend their time in Slovenský raj mountain range.

Railway 
The town lies on the  Košice-Bohumín railway between Spišský Štiavnik and  Letanovce stations.

References

External links
http://www.vydrnik.sk/ Official homepage

 

Villages and municipalities in Poprad District